"Who Got da Props?", (titled on the single as "Who Got the Props") is a song written by American rapper Buckshot and record producer Evil Dee, performed by East Coast hip hop group Black Moon. It was recorded in 1992 and produced by Evil Dee. Pre-production took place at the Dewgarde Crib of Hits with following recording sessions at D&D Studios in New York. It was released on October 22, 1992 through Nervous Records as the lead single from the group's debut studio album Enta da Stage, marking the debut on hip hop scene by both the artists and the label. Accompanying music video was directed by Ralph McDaniels.

"Who Got the Props" peaked at number 86 on the Billboard Hot 100, number 60 on the Hot R&B/Hip-Hop Songs and number 28 on both Hot Rap Singles and Hot Dance Music/Maxi-Singles Sales in the United States, becoming an underground hit and the group's highest charted single to date. In 2013, Complex listed the song at #25 on its 'The 50 Best Debut Rap Singles'.

Track listing 
"Who Got the Props" (12"), Nervous Records (NER 20026)

 Ruff Side

1. "Who Got the Props" (Evil Dee's Deadly Mix) – (5:00)

2. "Who Got the Props" (Evil Dee's Deadly Instrumental) – (4:51)

3. "Who Got the Props" (MW Smooth Mix) – (4:49)

 Rugged Side

4. "Fuck It Up" (Rugged and Ruff Mix) – (4:00)

5. "Fuck It Up" (Rugged and Ruff Instrumental) – (3:59)

6. "Who Got the Props" (MW Smooth Instrumental) – (4:53)

Personnel 

 Kenyatta Blake – songwriter, vocals
 Ewart Dewgrade – songwriter, producer, mixing
 Shlomo Sonnenfeld – engineering, additional producer on MW Smooth versions
 Walt Dewgrade – mixing on MW Smooth versions
 Chuck Chillout – executive producer

References

External links 

 

1992 songs
1992 debut singles
1993 singles